Anastasia Kuzmina (born 21 March 1993 in Kyiv) is a Ukrainian dancer and media personality.

Biography 
A professional dancer since 2001, Kuzmina is best known for her participation with model and actor Andrés Gil in three Italian reality shows. In January 2012, the Argentinian media personality Gil took part (with Bobo Vieri, Alex Belli, Anna Tatangelo, Ria Antoniou, Ariadna Romero and other contestants) in the eighth series of the Italian reality show Ballando con le Stelle hosted on Rai 1 by Milly Carlucci with Paolo Belli and his Big Band. In that series, the couple Gil-Kuzmina won the first place; they won, in April 2012, the third place in the contest of champions, named Ballando con te, against some past champions of the past editions of Ballando con le Stelle. In September 2012, Kuzmina and Gil took part in the first season, aired on Rai 2 with Emanuele Filiberto di Savoia as host, of Pechino Express, the Italian version of the international reality show Peking Express. In October 2014 Kuzmina took part in the tenth season of Ballando con le Stelle with Tony Colombo. In March 2019 Kuzmina became the host (with Lorenzo Branchetti) of Happy Dance, a children's dance program aired by Rai Gulp. In February 2021 Kuzmina started a stage with PMI in Switzerland.

Filmography

Television

References

1993 births
Living people
Ukrainian female dancers
Ukrainian television personalities